The Victorian Railways Z class were three locomotives built in 1893 in Victoria, Australia. The class is unusual in that the third member of the class bore little resemblance to the first two. One example of the class survives, at the Scienceworks Museum in Melbourne.

The first two being built in 1893 were two  locomotives which had their full length covered in with an extended cab in the style of a road tramway motor. They were allocated numbers 522 and 524 with the classification Z. Their full length cabs were later cut back to a normal length revealing a thin chimney and a drum-shaped dome. They were scrapped in 1910 and 1911.

The third engine was also built in 1893, and was the first locomotive built by the new enlarged railway workshops at Newport. It was numbered 526 and despite bearing little resemblance to the two Phoenix motors it was also classified Z, perhaps because no more letters were available except I which would have been avoided because it resembled 1. In 1903 it was rebuilt as a crane locomotive as No. 3 Steam Crane. After spending many years at the South Dynon Locomotive Depot, Z 526 was withdrawn in June 1978, and between 1980 and 1985 the locomotive was restored at Newport Workshops to its 1893 side tank configuration, and was donated to Museum Victoria in 1992.

References

External links
 Victorian Preserved Steam Locomotives detailed information about all surviving ex-VR steam locos
 Z class drawings

Z class
2-4-0T locomotives
0-6-0 locomotives
Railway locomotives introduced in 1893
Broad gauge locomotives in Australia